Aranmula Kottaram or Aranmula Palace is an old palace at Aranmula, a historical and traditional village in Kerala, India. Aranmula Palace was built more than 200 years ago. This palace is known as Aranmula Vadakke Kottaram (or Northern Palace). The palace is the halting place of holy journey "Thiruvabharana khosha yathra" (a ritual of the Sabarimala Temple and the Pandalam Palace).  It is situated in front of the Aranmula_Parthasarathy_Temple and very close to the Holy Pamba River. The palace is one of the best and rare example of the Nalukettu architectural form.

See also
Aranmula

References

Palaces_in_Kerala
History of Pathanamthitta district
Historic_sites_in_India
Royal residences in India
Buildings and structures in Pathanamthitta district
Aranmula
Kingdom of Thekkumkur